Nasreddin Murat-Khan  (1904 – 15 October 1970) was a Russian-born Pakistani architect and civil engineer. He is renowned for designing the iconic national monument, the Minar-e-Pakistan. He was also the architect of the Gaddafi Stadium and several other notable buildings and structures.

Life

Early life
Murat-Khan was born in 1904 to a Turkic Kumyk Muslim family, in the town of Buynaksk in the North Caucasus region of Dagestan located in the Russian Empire (modern-day Russian Federation). In 1930, he obtained his degree of civil engineering from the Institute of Architects, Town Planners and Civil Engineers at Leningrad State University (now the Saint-Petersburg State University). Later, he also obtained degrees of architecture and town planning from the same university.

Exile
Murat-Khan was keen to free the Muslim Caucasus region from Soviet control. As a result, he had to flee from Dagestan— in fear of his life—to Germany where he landed sometime in 1944. He stayed as a refugee in one of the camps established by the UNRRA in Berlin, later moving to Mittenwald where he married Hamida Akmut, a Turkish refugee, in 1946.

Pakistan

After the six-year-long exile in West Germany, Murat-Khan migrated with his family to Pakistan, in 1950.

Death

Murat-Khan died of a heart attack on 15 October 1970.

Professional career

In 1930, Nasreddin held a variety of posts in Dagestan and in Leningrad. He was arrested during the "Engineers' Purges" undertaken by Stalin, but was re-instated in February 1940 as Chief Engineer and Chief Architect of the Pyatigorsk branch of the North Caucasian Project Trust. He later served as Chief Engineer and Director of the North Caucasian Project Trust in Woroschilowsk, Ukraine, till August 1942. Murat-Khan planned and designed many buildings of the Soviet Union, which includes a Lenin Memorial. In 1950, after his migration to Pakistan, he was hired as Executive Engineer for PWD at Wah Ordinance Factory. He then was reassigned in 1951 as Special Architect, B&R Deptt., PWD, where he designed the buildings of the Nishtar Hospital and the Nishtar Medical College. In addition, he also prepared the designs of the Mansehra Mental Hospital, the Sahala Police Training College, the Sinclair Hall in Forman Christian College, the Gaddafi Stadium in Lahore (completed in 1959 and initially called the Lahore Stadium) and the Textile College in Faisalabad among many other buildings, townships, residences and other structures.

Minar-e-Pakistan

Murat-Khan's most notable and memorable work is his design of the Minar-e-Pakistan monument, located at Minto Park (now Iqbal Park) in the walled city of Lahore. The foundation stone of Minar-e-Pakistan was laid at Minto Park on 23 March 1960. In 1963, President Ayub Khan reportedly summoned Murat-Khan to his office and took out a fountain pen from his pocket, placed it upright on his desk and instructed Murat-Khan to "build me a monument like this."

Murat-Khan was very keen on the supervision of the construction and the design. He frequently visited the site to inspect building material, construction quality. He did not take his prescribed fee of Rs. 250,000 and instead donated the amount to the fund created for financing the construction of the Minar-e-Pakistan. The construction of the tower took eight years and by 31 October 1968, the minar was completed at a cost of Rs. 7.5 million.

Awards

In recognition of Murat-Khan's services, the then President of Pakistan, General Ayub Khan, conferred on him the Tamghah-yi Imtiyaz (Medal of Excellence) in 1963.

Views and legacy

Murat-Khan was of the view that each local body should have a chief architect of its own. He was also a proponent of Islamic architecture, advocating the retention of a national character in Pakistani architecture.

Gallery

See also
 Pakistani architecture
 Russian architecture
 List of Pakistani architects
 List of Russian architects

Notes

References

Bibliography

 

 
1904 births
1970 deaths
20th-century Pakistani architects
Architects from Lahore
Engineers from Lahore
Kumyks
Naturalised citizens of Pakistan
Pakistani civil engineers
Pakistani people of Dagestani descent
Pakistani people of Turkic descent
Pakistani urban planners
People from Dagestan
Recipients of Tamgha-e-Imtiaz
Saint Petersburg State University alumni
Soviet architects
Soviet civil engineers
20th-century engineers
Soviet defectors
Soviet emigrants to Germany
Soviet emigrants to Pakistan
Soviet Muslims
Soviet urban planners